Arbequina is a cultivar of olives. The fruit is highly aromatic, small, symmetrical and dark brown, with a rounded apex and a broad peduncular cavity. In Europe, it is mostly grown in Catalonia, Spain, but it is also grown in Aragon and Andalusia, as well as California, Argentina, Chile, Australia and Azerbaijan. It has recently become one of the dominant olive cultivars in the world, largely under highly intensive, "super high-density" plantation.

Etymology
The name comes from the village of Arbeca in the comarca of the Les Garrigues, where it was first introduced to Europe from the Ottoman Empire in the 17th century by the Duke of Medinaceli, and it has become one of the most widely planted cultivars in the world.

Countries of cultivation

Arbequina is grown in Albania, Algeria, Argentina, Australia: Areas of Adelaide, Buaraba, Loxton, New South Wales, Queensland, South Australia, and Western Australia, Bolivia, Brazil: (Paraná), Chile: Areas of Arica, Huasco, and Limari, Egypt, France: Areas of Alpes-Maritimes and Hérault, Iran (Gilan), Israel, Libya, Mexico: Areas of Aguascalientes, Caborca, and Sonora, Morocco, Peru: Areas of Arequipa and Moquegua, Portugal, Saudi Arabia, Spain: Areas of Albacete, Almeria, Andalucía, Aragón, Avila, Barcelona, Catalonia, Córdoba, Cuenca, Gerona, Granada, Guadalajara, Huesca, Lérida, Madrid, Sevilla, Tarragona, Teruel, and Zaragoza, South Africa (Western Cape),  Turkey, the United States (Winter Garden Region, Texas), and Uruguaiana, Brazil.

Synonyms and areas

Arbequina is also known as: 21 kilo in Córdoba, Cuyo, and Mendoza, Alberchino in areas of Granada and Guadalajara, Arbequi in  Lérida, Arbequin in Albacete, Almeria, Avila, Guadalajara, Huesca, Lérida, Logroño, Tarragona, Teruel and Mendoza in Argentina, Arbequina Catalana in some areas of Córdoba, Arlequin in Almería, Blanca in Huesca, Blanca De Espãna in some areas of Argentina, K 18 in Al-Jouf, Manglot (Del) in some areas of Albacete and Valencia.

Agronomic characteristics

Arbequina trees are adaptable to different conditions of climate and soil, although it does best in alkaline soils; it thrives in long, hot, dry summers, but is frost-hardy and pest-resistant. Its relatively small cup, allows it to be cultivated under more intense, high-density conditions than other plantation olives The variety is very productive and enters early into production (from the first half of November). The fruit does not ripen simultaneously, and has an average resistance to detachment. Unlike most varieties, Arbequina has a high germination percentage, making it a common seedling tree for use as a rootstock. 78% of olive oil acres in California are planted on Arbequina rootstock.

Gastronomy
Although sold as a table olive as well, Arbequina olives have one of the highest concentrations of oil, and are therefore mostly used for olive oil production. Harvesting is easy since the trees are typically low to the ground and allow for easy hand picking. Oils made from Arbequina are generally buttery, fruity, and very mild in flavor, being low in polyphenols. The combination of low polyphenol levels and high levels of polyunsaturated fat as compared with other olive cultivars means that it has relatively low stability and short shelf-life.

Cross breeding
Hybridization using the Arbequina and Picual (Rallo et al 2008) resulted in the newer Chiquitota variety.

See also 
 List of olive cultivars

References

External links

Olive cultivars